Paul Pratt (born May 1, 1985) is a former American football cornerback. He was signed by the New York Sentinels as a street free agent in 2009. He played college football at Nevada.

Pratt has also been a member of the Detroit Lions.

External links

Just Sports Stats
Detroit Lions bio
Nevada Wolf Pack bio
United Football League bio

1985 births
Living people
Players of American football from Los Angeles
American football cornerbacks
Nevada Wolf Pack football players
New York Sentinels players
Detroit Lions players